This article is a list of notable individuals who were born in and/or have lived in Leawood, Kansas.

Academia
 Jeffrey L. Fisher (1970– ), law professor, U.S. Supreme Court litigator

Arts and entertainment

Film, television, and theatre
 Holley Fain (1981– ), actress
 Nancy Opel (1957– ), singer, actress

Gaming
 Nick Plott (1984– ), eSports commentator
 Sean Plott (1986– ), pro StarCraft gamer, caster, webshow host

Literature
 Julie Garwood (1944– ), novelist
 Candice Millard (1968– ), historian, journalist
 Doug Worgul (1953– ), novelist, non-fiction author

Music
 Jim Abel (1947– ), singer-songwriter
 Phil Keaggy (1951– ), guitarist, singer

Business
 Min Kao, co-founder of Garmin Corporation
Joyce Clyde Hall, founder of Hallmark Cards

Politics
 Karen McCarthy (1947–2010), U.S. Representative from Missouri

Sports

American football
 Trent Green (1970– ), quarterback
 Mark Vlasic (1963– ), quarterback

Baseball
 Joe Carter (1960– ), outfielder, first baseman
 Alex Gordon, outfielder
 Mike Morin (1991– ), relief pitcher
 Dan Quisenberry (1953–1998), pitcher
 Kevin Seitzer (1962– ), third baseman, hitting coach

Soccer
 Jon Kempin (1993– ), goalkeeper
 Ryan Raybould (1983– ), midfielder, defender
 Seth Sinovic (1987– ), defender

Tennis
 Jennifer Hopkins (1981– ), tennis player
 Jack Sock (1992– ), tennis player

See also
 List of people from Johnson County, Kansas
 Lists of people from Kansas

References

Leawood, Kansas
Leawood